Muhammad Mustapha Abdallah (born 13 November 1954) is a retired Nigerian Army Colonel who served as Chairman of the National Drug Law Enforcement Agency appointed to the post by President Muhammadu Buhari on 11 January 2016.

References

1954 births
Living people
Nigerian Muslims
People from Adamawa State
Ahmadu Bello University alumni
Nigerian Defence Academy alumni
Sam Houston State University alumni